The Bamu River is a river in southwestern Papua New Guinea.

See also
List of rivers of Papua New Guinea
 Bamu language, a language of Papua New Guinea
 Bamu Rural LLG, Papua New Guinea

References

Rivers of Papua New Guinea